Volodymyr Makhankov (born 29 October 1997) is a professional Ukrainian football goalkeeper who plays for Kolos Kovalivka in the Ukrainian Premier League.

Career
Makhankov was born in Slavutych, and in age of 6 he began to play football in Kyiv, where he joined the FC Dynamo Kyiv youth sportive school system, where his first trainer was Viktor Kashchey.

Despite being a part of Dynamo's sportive system, Makhankov never make his debut for the main team and in March 2020 transferred to the Ukrainian Premier League side FC Dynamo Kyiv and later this year, to the Ukrainian Second League side FC Polissya Zhytomyr, where he become a first choice goalkeeping player. In June 2021 he signed a 3 years deal with FC Kolos Kovalivka.

References

External links
 
 

1997 births
Living people
People from Slavutych
Ukraine youth international footballers
Ukraine under-21 international footballers
Ukrainian footballers
Association football goalkeepers
FC Polissya Zhytomyr players
FC Kolos Kovalivka players
Ukrainian Premier League players
Ukrainian First League players
Sportspeople from Kyiv Oblast